Karo is an Armenian given name, a shortened version of the Armenian given name Karapet (Eastern Armenian) / Garabed (Western Armenian). The Western Armenian variant of Karo is Garo.

Given name
 Karo Ghafadaryan (1907–1976), Soviet Armenian archaeologist, historian, and epigraphist
 Karo Haghverdian (born 1945), Iranian-Armenian football player
 Karo Halabyan (1897-1959), Soviet Armenian architect
 Karo Mkrtchyan (1951–2001), Armenian painter 
 Karo Murat (born 1983), Armenian-German professional boxer
 Karo Parisyan (born 1982), Armenian-American mixed martial arts fighter
 Karo Bonas (born 1984), Persian born Legend and Personality
 Karo Lumis (born 1980), Papua New Guinean cricketer

Surname
 Aaron Karo (born 1979), American author and comedian
 Armen Karo (or Garo) (1872–1923), Armenian nationalist politician
 Ezekiel Karo (1844–1915), German rabbi and historian
 Henry Arnold Karo (1903–1986), vice admiral in the United States Coast and Geodetic Survey
 Isaac Karo (1458-1535), Spanish rabbi
 Joseph Karo (1488–1575), also known as Yosef Karo or Caro, Spanish-born rabbi and author of the Shulchan Aruch
 Paul Karo, Australian actor

See also

Garo (name)
Karlo (name)
Karol (name)

Armenian masculine given names